Ichthyostega (from  , 'fish' and  , 'roof') is an extinct genus of limbed tetrapodomorphs from the Late Devonian of Greenland. It was among the earliest four-limbed vertebrates in the fossil record, and was one of the first with weight-bearing adaptations for terrestrial locomotion. Ichthyostega possessed lungs and limbs that helped it navigate through shallow water in swamps. Although Ichthyostega is often labelled a 'tetrapod' due to the possession of limbs and fingers, it evolved long before true crown group tetrapods, and could more accurately be referred to as a stegocephalian or stem tetrapod. Likewise, while undoubtedly of amphibian build and habit, it is not considered a true member of the group in the narrow sense, as the first modern amphibians (members of the group Lissamphibia) appeared in the Triassic Period. Until finds of other early stegocephalians and closely related fishes in the late 20th century, Ichthyostega stood alone as a transitional fossil between fish and tetrapods, combining fish- and tetrapod-like features. Newer research has shown that it had an unusual anatomy, functioning more akin to a seal than a salamander, as previously assumed.

Description

Ichthyostega was a fairly large animal, broadly built and about 1.5 m (4.9 ft) long. The skull was low, with dorsally placed eyes and large labyrinthodont teeth. The posterior margin of the skull formed an operculum covering the gills. The spiracle was situated in an otic notch behind each eye.

Limbs 
The limbs were large compared to contemporary relatives, and it had seven digits on each hind limb. The exact number of digits on the forelimb is not yet known, since fossils of the manus (hand) have not been found. While in water, the foot would have functioned like a fleshy paddle more than a fin.

Torso 
The vertebral column and ribcage of Ichthyostega was unusual and highly specialized relative to both its contemporaries and later tetrapods. The thoracic vertebrae at the front of the trunk and the short neck have tall neural spines which lean backwards. They attach to pointed ribs which increase in size and acquire prominent overlapping flanges. Past the sixth or seventh flanged rib, the ribs abruptly decrease in size and lose their flanges. The lumbar vertebrae, at the back of the trunk, have strong muscle scars and neural spines which are bent forwards and decrease in size towards the hip. The sacral vertebrae, above the hips, have fan-shaped neural spines which transition from forward-leaning to backward-leaning as they approach the tail. The vertebrae right behind the hips have unusually large ribs similar to the thoracic region. The caudal (tail) vertebrae have slender spines which lean backwards. The tail of Ichthyostega retained a low fin supported by bony lepidotrichia (fin rays). The tail fin was not as deep as in Acanthostega, and would have been less useful for swimming.

Ichthyostega is related to Acanthostega gunnari, also from East Greenland. Ichthyostega'''s skull seems more fish-like than that of Acanthostega, but its girdle (shoulder and hip) morphology seems stronger and better adapted to life on land. Ichthyostega also had more supportive ribs and stronger vertebrae with more developed zygapophyses. Whether these traits were independently evolved in Ichthyostega is debated. It does, however, show that Ichthyostega may have ventured onto land on occasions, unlike contemporaneous limbed vertebrates such as Elginerpeton and Obruchevichthys.

 History 
 
In 1932 Gunnar Säve-Söderbergh described four Ichthyostega species from the Late Devonian of East Greenland and one species belonging to the genus Ichthyostegopsis, I. wimani. These species could be synonymous (in which case only I. stensioei would remain), because their morphological differences are not very pronounced. The species differ in skull proportions, skull punctuation and skull bone patterns. The comparisons were done on 14 specimens collected in 1931 by the Danish East Greenland Expedition. Additional specimens were collected between 1933 and 1955.

Classification
Traditionally, Ichthyostega was considered part of an order named for it, the "Ichthyostegalia". however, this group represents a paraphyletic grade of primitive stem-tetrapods and is not used by many modern researchers. Phylogenetic analysis has shown Ichthyostega is intermediate between other primitive stegocephalian stem-tetrapods. The evolutionary tree of early stegocephalians below follows the results of one such analysis performed by Swartz in 2012.

 Paleobiology 

Early limbed vertebrates like Ichthyostega and Acanthostega differed from earlier tetrapodomorphs such as Eusthenopteron or Panderichthys in their increased adaptations for life on land. Though tetrapodomorphs possessed lungs, they used gills as their primary means of discharging carbon dioxide. Tetrapodomorphs used their bodies and tails for locomotion and their fins for steering and braking; Ichthyostega may have used its forelimbs for locomotion on land and its tail for swimming.

Its massive ribcage was made up of overlapping ribs and the animal possessed a stronger skeletal structure, a largely fishlike spine, and forelimbs apparently powerful enough to pull the body from the water. These anatomical modifications may have evolved to handle the lack of buoyancy experienced on land. The hindlimbs were smaller than the forelimbs and unlikely to have borne full weight in an adult, while the broad, overlapping ribs would have inhibited side-to-side movements. The forelimbs had the required range of movement to push the body up and forward, probably allowing the animal to drag itself across flat land by synchronous (rather than alternate) "crutching" movements, much like that of a mudskipper or a seal. It was incapable of typical quadrupedal gaits as the forelimbs lacked the necessary rotary motion range.

 See also 

 Evolutionary history of life
 Hynerpeton List of transitional fossils
 List of prehistoric amphibians
 Ymeria References 

Further reading
 
 

 External links 
 Tree of Life Site on early tetrapods
 Getting a Leg Up on Land Scientific American Nov. 21, 2005, article by Jennifer A. Clack.
 BBC News: Ancient walking mystery deepens
 3D computer model, forelimb maximal joint range, and hindlimb maximal joint range of Icthyostega'' on YouTube, videos by Stephanie E. Pierce, Jennifer A. Clack, & John R. Hutchinson

Stegocephalians
Devonian tetrapods
Transitional fossils
Fossil taxa described in 1932
Fossils of Greenland
Late Devonian genus first appearances
Late Devonian genus extinctions
Evolution of tetrapods